Opisthopatus is a genus of South African velvet worms in the family Peripatopsidae.
The number of legs in this genus range from 16 pairs (e.g., in O. cinctipes) to 18 pairs (in O. roseus). Mothers in this genus give birth to live young. In particular, this genus exhibits matrotrophic viviparity, that is, mothers in this genus retain eggs in their uteri and supply nourishment to their embryos, but without any placenta.

Species 
The genus contains the following species:

 Opisthopatus amatolensis Choonoo, 1947
 Opisthopatus amaxhosa Daniels et al., 2016
 Opisthopatus baziya Barnes & Daniels, 2022
 Opisthopatus camdebooi Barnes & Daniels, 2022
 Opisthopatus cinctipes Purcell, 1899
 Opisthopatus drakensbergi Daniels et al., 2016 
 Opisthopatus herbertorum Ruhberg & Hamer, 2005
 Opisthopatus highveldi Daniels et al., 2016 
 Opisthopatus kwazululandi Daniels et al., 2016 
 Opisthopatus laevis Lawrence, 1947
 Opisthopatus natalensis Bouvier, 1900
 Opisthopatus roseus Lawrence, 1947, the pink velvet worm
 Opisthopatus swatii Daniels et al., 2016

References 

Endemic fauna of South Africa
Onychophorans of temperate Africa
Onychophoran genera
Taxa named by William Frederick Purcell
Taxonomy articles created by Polbot